The Real McCoy is the seventh album by jazz pianist McCoy Tyner and his first released on the Blue Note label. It was recorded on April 21, 1967 following Tyner's departure from the John Coltrane Quartet and features performances by Tyner with tenor saxophonist Joe Henderson, bassist  Ron Carter and drummer Elvin Jones. Producer Alfred Lion recalls the recording session as a "pure jazz session. There is absolutely no concession to commercialism, and there's a deep, passionate love for the music embedded in each of the selections".

Reception
The Penguin Guide to Jazz selected this album as part of its suggested "Core Collection" calling it "A key album in Tyner's discography... Very highly recommended." The Allmusic review by Scott Yanow states that "Tyner was entering a period of struggle, although artistically his playing grew quite a bit in the late '60s... easily recommended".

The pieces
In the liner notes, Tyner talks about the pieces selected for this album. The titles for "Passion Dance" and "Contemplation" came to the pianist only after he'd written the pieces. Whilst the former sounds like "a kind of American Indian dance, evoking trance-like states", the latter has "the sound of a man alone. A man reflecting on what religion means to him, reflecting on the meaning of life." Tyner titled the fourth piece "Search for Peace" because of its tranquil feeling; it "has to do with a man's submission to God" and the "giving over of the self to the universe". The album closes with an upbeat, merry piece called "Blues on the Corner", a reminiscent musical portrait of Tyner's childhood: "When I was growing up in Philadelphia, some of the kids I knew liked to hang out on the corner [...] youngsters talking, kidding around, jiving."

Track listing
All compositions by McCoy Tyner

 "Passion Dance" – 8:47
 "Contemplation" – 9:12
 "Four by Five" – 6:37
 "Search for Peace" – 6:32
 "Blues on the Corner" – 5:58

Personnel
McCoy Tyner - piano
Joe Henderson - tenor saxophone
Ron Carter - bass
Elvin Jones - drums

References

1967 albums
Blue Note Records albums
Post-bop albums
McCoy Tyner albums
Albums produced by Alfred Lion
Albums recorded at Van Gelder Studio